Penicillium hirayamae is an anamorph species of the genus of Penicillium which produces rubrorotiorin.

References

Further reading

 
 

hirayamae
Fungi described in 1959